John Ramsey (1887–1972) was a pseudonym used by Reginald Owen. He was co-author of the 1911 play Where the Rainbow Ends with Mrs Clifford Mills and music by R. Quilter. Owen provided stage know-how.

Plays 

 Where the Rainbow Ends (1911) written with Clifford Mills
 The Joker (1915) written with Ernest Schofield
 The Jolly Family (1927)

Notes

British dramatists and playwrights
British male dramatists and playwrights